North Worcestershire was a county constituency in the county of Worcestershire, which returned one Member of Parliament (MP) to the House of Commons of the Parliament of the United Kingdom, elected by the first past the post voting system.

It was created by the Redistribution of Seats Act 1885 for the 1885 general election. The constituency was abolished for the 1918 general election.

Boundaries
The constituency included the Sessional Divisions of Halesowen and Oldbury, the Municipal Borough of Dudley, and the parishes of Cradley, Lutley, Lye, 
and Northfield.

Members of Parliament

Elections

Elections in the 1880s

Elections in the 1890s

Elections in the 1900s

Elections in the 1910s 

General Election 1914–15:

Another General Election was required to take place before the end of 1915. The political parties had been making preparations for an election to take place and by the July 1914, the following candidates had been selected; 
Liberal: John Wilson
Unionist:

References

Parliamentary constituencies in Worcestershire (historic)
Constituencies of the Parliament of the United Kingdom established in 1885
Constituencies of the Parliament of the United Kingdom disestablished in 1918